North Central Texas Academy (NCTA) is a boarding, day, and international Christian school, located on a 500-acre campus known as Happy Hill Farm. It is fully accredited (K-12) by the Southern Association of Colleges and Schools (SACS) and is a member of The Association of Boarding Schools (TABS). There is an athletic center, dining center, fine arts center, residences for boarding students, staff housing, an agricultural center with a show ring, livestock pens, stables and riding trails, athletic fields, a track and stadium, swimming pool, tennis courts, a welcome center, an inn and training center, and an administrative center.

History 
The Academy was opened in 1975, with 20 students in a mobile home. Underprivileged students on scholarship, international, and local day students study within a college-preparatory environment.

Academy life
As a working farm with an FFA Chapter, Happy Hill Farm raises cattle, swine, lambs, and goats. There are horses, llamas, alpacas, camels, and buffalo. NCTA has a very large and active FFA & 4-H program. Students in these programs care daily for their livestock. Grain and hay crops are also grown.

NCTA teams excel in track, football, volleyball, basketball, baseball, and more, competing in the Texas Association of Private & Parochial Schools League (TAPPS).  The NCTA football team won back-to-back State Championships, and the NCTA girls' basketball team captured the TAPPS State Championship in 2011, 2012, 2013, 2014, 2015, and 2016.  The NCTA boys basketball team has taken the TAPPS State Championship in 2014, 2015, 2016, and 2017.  The NCTA Art Team also accomplished a State Championship.

The students live in boarding homes. There are up to eight students per house, two per room, and each home has a live-in resident parent couple and a live-in single assistant resident parent.

Sports 
NCTA is a member of the Texas Christian Athletic League.

External links

References 

Private K-12 schools in Texas
Educational institutions established in 1975
1975 establishments in Texas
Education in Somervell County, Texas
Private boarding schools in Texas